Harry Hayden (8 November 1882 – 24 July 1955) was a Canadian-American actor. He was a highly prolific actor, with more than 280 screen credits.

Career
Born in Canada in 1882, Hayden was slight, greying at the temples and wore glasses, and the characters he played were often small-town store proprietors, hotel managers, city attorneys, bankers and minor bureaucrats, frequently officious or snooping.

Hayden worked both onstage and in films, and with his wife, actress Lela Bliss, to whom he was married from 1924 until his death, he ran the Bliss-Hayden miniature theatre in Beverly Hills, whose alumni include Veronica Lake, Doris Day, Debbie Reynolds, and Marilyn Monroe.  He directed one production on Broadway, a play called Thirsty Soil, which opened in February 1937.

Hayden began appearing in films in 1936, when he was seen in Foolproof, a crime drama short, and worked consistently and steadily until 1954.  At the peak of his career, in the late 1930s and early 1940s, a dozen or two films would be released every year in which Hayden appeared.  Often his work went uncredited, but he was notable in Laurel and Hardy's Saps at Sea in 1940 as Mr. Sharp, the horn factory owner, and as Farley Granger's boss in 1951's O. Henry's Full House.  In the 1940s, Hayden was part of Preston Sturges' unofficial "stock company" of character actors, appearing in six films written and directed by Sturges.

Television also provided some opportunities for this ubiquitous actor.  Hayden did a handful of episodic television shows from 1951 to 1955,  in 1952 he played  Stephen Wilson, the father of Margie's  boyfriend in the episode "Vern's Chums", in "My Little Margie",  he also had a recurring role as "Harry Johnson" on The Stu Erwin Show, also known as The Trouble With Father, although he was not credited for this when the show went to syndication.

Hayden appeared in his final film, The Desperado, in 1954. He died in West Los Angeles, California on 24 July 1955, at the age of 72, and is buried in Forest Lawn Memorial Park in Glendale, California.  He had one son with actress Lela Bliss, Harry Hayden.

Partial filmography

 I Married a Doctor (1936)
 Killer at Large (1936)
 Two Against the World (1936) as Dr. Martin Leavenworth
 Artists and Models (1937)
 Black Legion (1937) as Jones
 I'll Give a Million (1938)
 Saleslady (1938)
 Wife, Husband and Friend (1939)
 Rose of Washington Square (1939)
 The Rains Came (1939)
 Should a Girl Marry? (1939)
 Barricade (1939)
 Swanee River (1939)
 He Married His Wife (1940)
 Saps at Sea (1940) (uncredited)
 Lillian Russell (1940)
 Christmas in July (1940) (uncredited)
 A Man Betrayed (1941)
 Remember the Day (1941)
 Rings on Her Fingers (1942)
 The Lone Star Ranger (1942)
 Yankee Doodle Dandy (1942) as Dr. Lewellyn (uncredited)
 The Magnificent Dope (1942)
 Joan of Ozark (1942)
 Tales of Manhattan (1942)
 Hello, Frisco, Hello (1943) as Burkham
 She Has What It Takes (1943) as Mr. Jason
 The Unknown Guest (1943) as George Nadroy
 The Big Noise (1944)
 Hail the Conquering Hero (1944)
 Two Sisters from Boston (1946)
 The Killers (1946) (uncredited)
 Till the Clouds Roll By (1946)
 Millie's Daughter (1947) (uncredited)
 Variety Girl (1947)
 Merton of the Movies (1947)
 The Dude Goes West (1948)
 The Velvet Touch (1948)
 Good Sam (1948)
 Every Girl Should Be Married (1948)
 Abbott and Costello Meet the Killer, Boris Karloff (1949)
 Intruder in the Dust (1949)
 Gun Crazy (1950)
 The Traveling Saleswoman (1950)
 Union Station (1950) 
 Double Dynamite (1951)
 Carrie (1952)
 Army Bound (1952)
 O. Henry's Full House (1952)

References

External links

1882 births
1955 deaths
Canadian male film actors
Canadian male stage actors
Canadian male television actors
Burials at Forest Lawn Memorial Park (Glendale)
20th-century Canadian male actors
Canadian expatriate male actors in the United States